The 1995–1996 Highland Football League was won by Huntly.

Table

Highland Football League seasons
4